Mary Cheves West Perky (1874–1940) was an American psychologist who was one of the many aspiring female student psychologists who studied under Edward B. Titchener at Cornell University. Perky received her Ph.D. in 1910 and her dissertation was a detailed study of visual, auditory, and olfactory imagery that had a considerable impact with being cited by name in the title of an article as recently as 2012. In 1910, she performed the "Banana Experiment," which led to the discovery of the phenomenon known as the Perky Effect, which examines the link between mental imagery and visual perception.

Perky also studied the cooperative movement, and became the Associate Secretary of the Cooperative League of America.

The Perky Effect 
While some of Titchener's work has "long since fallen into disrepute," the work performed in his lab in 1910 by Perky has "achieved something of a classic, even mythic, status in the literature on imagery."

Perky's famous experiments demonstrated how sensory input, or perceptions, can be mistaken for a mental image when perceptual processes and mental imagery interfere with each other. Now known as the Perky Effect, her research described the result when a subject's visual perception is altered by mental imagery.

To test her hypothesis, Perky trained her participants to look at a blank screen and try to imagine an object such as a banana. She then asked her participants to fixate a point on a screen in front of them and to visualize various objects there, such as a tomato, a book, a leaf, a banana, an orange, or a lemon. As the subjects did this, and unbeknownst to them, a faint patch of color, of an appropriate size and shape, and just above the normal threshold of visibility, was back-projected (in soft focus) onto the screen. Participants, believing that they were visualizing an object of their choice, typically reported an object that matched the shape and colors of the projected shapes. Perky had led them to assume that a physical stimulus was imagined.  The images were projected at a very low brightness to start and gradually increased in brightness. The participants were asked to describe the objects that corresponded to the image that was being projected. ...none of Perky's subjects (who ranged from a ten year old child to the trained and experienced introspectors of Titchener's laboratory) ever realized that they were experiencing real percepts; they took what they “saw” on the screen to be entirely the products of their imagination. In fact, however, the projections did influence their experiences.Participants reported that they believed they were imagining the projected images rather than actually perceiving them and they reported “seeing” the mental images in greater detail than what was actually presented in the stimulus. Imagery can be derived from short and long-term memories. Perky also distinguished between "images of memory" and "images of imagination." Images of memory are personal episodic images and are associated with more eye movements and feelings of familiarity. Images of imagination are more general, have little meaning to an individual, and may be associated with feelings of surprise.

The Perky Effect, which describes the link between mental imagery and visual perception, has been a foundation for continued research in visual perception and imagery. Her studies have inspired replications and further exploration of the different ways that perception and imagery can affect things like visual acuity.

Selected works 

 Perky, Cheves West. "An experimental study of imagination." The American Journal of Psychology 21.3 (1910): 422-452.
 Perky, Cheves West. Cooperation in the United States. Intercollegiate Socialist Society, 1919.
 Perky, Cheves West. "Children in the Museum." Bulletin of the Pennsylvania Museum 27.143 (1931): 11-14.

Literature

 Cooper, Cooper Sarah. Film and the Imagined Image. Edinburgh University Press, 2019.
 Proctor, Robert W., and Rand Evans. "EB Titchener, women psychologists, and the experimentalists." The American journal of psychology 127.4 (2014): 501-526.
 Calabi, Clotilde. "The Far Side of Things: Seeing, Visualizing and Knowing." Mind, Language and Action. De Gruyter, 2015. 335-346.
 Berger, Christopher C. Where imagination meets sensation: mental imagery, perception and multisensory Integration. Inst för neurovetenskap/Dept of Neuroscience, 2016.
 Dijkstra, Nadine, Peter Kok, and Stephen Fleming. "Perceptual reality monitoring: Neural mechanisms dissociating imagination from reality." (2021).
 Waller, David, et al. “A Century of Imagery Research: Reflections on Cheves Perky's Contribution to Our Understanding of Mental Imagery.” The American Journal of Psychology, vol. 125, no. 3, 2012, pp. 291–305. JSTOR, www.jstor.org/stable/10.5406/amerjpsyc.125.3.0291. Accessed 30 June 2021.

References

20th-century American psychologists
American women psychologists
1874 births
1940 deaths
20th-century American women scientists
Cornell University alumni